Megalobulimus jaguarunensis is a species of air-breathing land snails, a terrestrial gastropod mollusc in the family Strophocheilidae. This species was described from archaeological shell mounds (Figueirinha II circa 3,549 - 3,822 years CAL BP and Jabuticabeira II circa 1,180 - 3,200 years CAL BP ), known as sambaquis, located in the city of Jaguaruna, Santa Catarina, southern Brazil.

References

jaguarunensis
Endemic fauna of Brazil
Gastropods described in 2014